The 2012 Dominion Tankard, Southern Ontario men's provincial curling championship, was held from February 6 to 12, hosted by the Stratford Country Club at the Stratford Rotary Complex in Stratford, Ontario. The winning team of Glenn Howard, will represent Ontario at the 2012 Tim Hortons Brier in Saskatoon, Saskatchewan.

Teams

Standings

Results

Draw 1
February 6, 2:00 PM ET

Draw 2
February 6, 7:30 PM ET

Draw 3
February 7, 2:00 PM ET

Draw 4
February 7, 7:00 PM ET

Draw 5
February 8, 9:00 AM ET

Draw 6
February 8, 2:00 PM ET

Draw 7
February 8, 7:00 PM ET

Draw 8
February 9, 2:00 PM ET

Draw 9
February 9, 7:00 PM ET

Draw 10
February 10, 2:00 PM ET

Draw 11
February 10, 7:00 PM ET

Tiebreaker 1
February 11, 9:00 AM ET

Tiebreaker 2

February 11, 2:00 PM ET

Playoffs

1 vs. 2
February 11, 7:00 PM ET

3 vs. 4
February 11, 7:00 PM ET

Semifinal
February 12, 9:30 AM ET

Final
February 12, 2:00 PM ET

Qualification
Southern Ontario zones run from December 9-11, 2011, and December 16-19, 2011. Two teams from each zone qualify to four regional tournaments, and two teams from each of the four tournaments qualify to provincials. Two additional teams qualify out of the challenge round. 

The Northern Ontario provincial championship will occur December 8-11 at the Copper Cliff Curling Club in Copper Cliff, Ontario. Four teams qualify out of the Northern Ontario championship.

Regional Qualifiers In Bold

Southern Ontario Zone Qualification

Zone 1
December 9-11 at the RCMP Curling Club, Ottawa

 Shane Latimer (Ottawa Curling)
 Willie Jeffries (Ottawa Curling)
 Ron Hrycak (Ottawa Curling)
 Mark Homan (Ottawa Curling)
 Gary Rowe (Ottawa Curling)
 Team Dow (RCMP)
 Ian MacAulay (Ottawa Curling)

Zone 2
December 9-11 at the RCMP Curling Club, Ottawa

 Jim Hunker (Rideau)
 Bryan Cochrane (Rideau)
 Steve Lodge (Brockville) 
 Gregory Richardson (Rideau)
 Howard Rajala (Rideau)
 Daryl Smith (Rideau)
 Bill Blad (Rideau)

Zone 3
December 9-11 at the Pakenham Curling Club, Pakenham

 Josh Adams (Granite of W. Ottawa)
 Chris Gardner (Arnprior)
 Calvin Christiansen (Arnprior)
 Dennis Elgie (City View) 
 Dwayne Lowe (Huntley)
 Matt Paul (Renfrew)
 Damien Villard (Renfrew)

Zone 4
December 17-18 at the Brighton & District Curling Club, Brighton

Greg Balsdon (Loonie)
 Dennis Murray (Quinte)
 Bryce Rowe (Land O'Lakes)
 Jeff Clark (Loonie)
 Rob Dickson (Napanee)
 Gary Rusconi (Trenton)

Zone 5
December 17-18 at the Beaverton Curling Club, Beaverton

 Jon St.Denis (Peterborough C.C.)
 Wayne Warren (Haliburton)
 Jake Speedie (Beaverton)
 Wayne Shea (Bobcaygeon)
 Shannon Beddows (Cannington)
 Nick Avlonitis (Lakefield)
 Jim O'Marra (Peterborough C.C.)
 Mike Mclean (Peterborough C.C.)

Zone 6
December 10-11 at the Sutton Curling Club, Sutton West

 Sean Aune (Annandale)
 Mark Kean (Annandale)
 Nathan Martin (Oshawa Curling)
 Ryan Winch (Sutton)
 Gary Grant (Uxbridge)
 Rob Lobel (Whitby)
 Jason March (Annandale)
 John Bell (Unionville)
 Tim Morrison (Unionville)

Zone 7
December 10-11 at the East York Country Club, Toronto

 Mike Anderson (Thornhill)
 Michael Shepherd (East York)
 John Epping (Donalda)
 Dennis Moretto (Richmond Hill)
 Bob Turcotte (Scarboro)
 Geoff Truscott (Scarboro)
 Mark Inglis (Thornhill)
 Morio Kumagawa (York)

Zone 8
December 10-11 at the St. George's Golf & Country Club, Toronto

 Denis Belanger (Royals)
 Mike Harris (Oakville)
 Tom Worth (Dixie)
 Jonathan Braden (High Park)
 Pat Ferris (Oakville)
 Dave Pallen (Royals)
 Guy Racette (Royals)
 Bill Duck (St. George's)
 Ian Fleming (Royals)
 Josh Johnston (Royals)

Zone 9
December 10-11 at the King Curling Club, Schomberg

 Peter Corner (Brampton)
 Dayna Deruelle (Brampton)
 Rayad Husain (Chinguacousy)
 George Gerrits (King)
 Steve Broad (King)
 Jeff Brown (Shelburne)
 Alex Foster (North Halton)

Zone 10
December 10-11 at the Barrie Curling Club, Barrie

 Cory Heggestad (Orillia)
 G.W. King (Midland)
 Travis Dafoe (Bradford)
 Andrew Thompson (Stroud)
 Dale Matchett (Bradford)
 Steve Holmes (Parry Sound)

Zone 11
December 18 at the Blue Water Curling Club, Owen Sound

 Joey Rettinger (Tara)
 Al Hutchinson (Blue Water)
 Murray Dougherty (Meaford)
 Tom Slumskie (Tara)

Zone 12
December 10-11 at the Elmira & District Curling Club, Elmira

 Robert Rumfeldt (Guelph Curling)
 Axel Larsen (Guelph Curling) 
 Dave Kaun (K-W Granite)
 Peter Mellor (K-W Granite)
 Ed Cyr (Westmount)

Zone 13
December 10-11 at the St. Catharines Curling Club, St. Catharines

 Daniel Frans (St. Catharines Golf)
 Todd Brandwood (Glendale)
 Wayne Gowan (Dundas Granite)
 Rick Thurston (Dundas Granite)
 Steve Goodger (Dundas Granite) 
 Simon Ouellet (Glendale)
 Dan LeBlanc (Glendale)
 Garth Mitchell (Grimsby)

Zone 14
December 10 at the Mount Forest Curling Club, Mount Forest

 Jake Higgs (Harriston)
 Daryl Shane (Listowel)
 Mike Aprile (Listowel)

Zone 15
December 17-18 at the Woodstock Curling Club, Woodstock

 Bowie Abbis-Mills (Aylmer)
 Travis Fanset (Brant)
 Bob Armstrong (Ingersoll)
 Terry Corbin (Norwich)
 Nick Rizzo (Paris)
 Jim Lyle (St. Thomas)
 Wayne Tuck Jr. (Woodstock)

Zone 16
December 10-11 at the Chatham Granite Club, Chatham

 Mark Bice (Sarnia)
 Phil Daniel (Chatham Granite)
 Perry Smyth (Chatham Granite)
 John Young (Chatham Granite)
 Tim Lindsay (London)
 Tom Pruliere (Sarnia)

Regions
January 7-8, 2012

Region 1 (Zones 1-4)
Rideau Curling Club, Ottawa

Region 2 (Zones 5-8)
Granite Club, Toronto

Region 3 (Zones 9-12)
Meaford Curling Club, Meaford

Region 4 (Zones 13-16)
Brantford Golf & Country Club, Brantford

References

Dominion Tankard
Dominion Tankard
Dominion Tankard
Ontario Tankard
Sport in Stratford, Ontario